Isabella "Belle" Kendrick Abbott (November 3, 1842 – December 27, 1893) was an American author from the Deep South, whose only published novel, Leah Mordecai, was issued in 1875.

A native of Atlanta, she married Benjamin F. Abbott, and lived for many years on Peachtree Street, between Cain Street (subsequently renamed International Boulevard) and Harris Street.

Leah Mordecai

Leah Mordecai was published at Christmastime 1875, when Abbott was 33.  It is a coming of age story set in Charleston, South Carolina, during the 1850s, shortly before the Civil War. The title character, who is Jewish, finds herself subjected to scorn and abuse by the jealous and grasping woman who marries her widowed father, a wealthy banker. Seeking relief from her unhappiness, Leah only engenders further distress when, upon entering into marriage with an importunate gentile, she incurs the violent wrath of her father. The author, who was not Jewish, found herself unable to avoid stereotypes or convincingly portray detailed specifics as well as the mindset of contemporary Jewish life.

Notes

External links 
 
 

1842 births
1893 deaths
19th-century American novelists
19th-century American women writers
American women novelists
Writers from Atlanta
Novelists from Georgia (U.S. state)